Al-Hurriya Sports Club is a Syrian football club based in Aleppo. It was founded in 1952. They play their home games at the al-Hamadaniah Stadium.

History
1952 : Club founded as Al Arabi
1972 : Club renamed to Al Horriya

Honours
Syrian Premier League:
Champions: 1992, 1994
Syrian Cup:
Winners: 1992

Current squad

References

Horriya
Association football clubs established in 1952
Sport in Aleppo
1952 establishments in Syria